The Brünnlitz labor camp was a forced labor camp of Nazi Germany which was established in 1944 just outside the town of Brněnec ( in German), Protectorate of Bohemia and Moravia. Administratively, it was a sub-camp of the Gross-Rosen concentration camp system.

, the factory site remains abandoned; there are plans to convert it into a museum.

Command and control

The Brünnlitz labor camp was administratively a sub-camp of the Gross-Rosen concentration camp system. The camp was assigned an SS garrison consisting of about one hundred SS guards and female staff. The commander of the camp was SS-Obersturmführer Josef Leipold. From the very beginning, Schindler told the SS his factory would not operate as a typical camp, forbade guards to punish or harass the camp inmates, and barred any SS member from entering the operational part of the factory.

History
Prior to the fall of 1944, Oskar Schindler had owned an enamelware factory in Kraków and employed over 1,000 Jewish prisoners. When he learned that the nearby Kraków-Płaszów concentration camp was to be shut down and all its inmates (including his workers) sent to Auschwitz-Birkenau for extermination, he decided to set up the Brünnlitz labor camp. A large segment of Schindler's labor force consisted of unskilled workers or people who were too sick or weak to work, whom he had been protecting under the guise of essential labor, and he knew they would be killed soon after reaching Auschwitz. Using much of the money he had earned from his enamelware business, Schindler bribed SS and Nazi officials in order to gain permission to move his labor force to the Protectorate of Bohemia and Moravia and set up a munitions factory there. In addition, he had to pay the costs of converting a disused textile mill to munitions production, equipping it as a camp, and shipping his supplies and machinery there.

The "concentration camp" at Brünnlitz was simply a factory complex, with an attached barracks for the workers and no real external security to speak of. A token front gate and a perimeter fence were the only measures put in place to prevent escapes; however, every Jew at the complex was grateful to be there and hoped to survive the war under Schindler's protection. The SS guards at the camp were left with little to do, and Schindler supplied them with good food and alcohol as an incentive to leave his workers alone.

Between November 1944 and January 1945, the Brünnlitz labor camp was visited several times by former Płaszów commandant Amon Göth, who considered himself a friend to Schindler. The inmates at Brünnlitz, many of whom had suffered harshly under Göth, remarked that he was a physically changed man and looked feeble and pathetic compared to his early tenure when he was a figure who commanded absolute fear and terror.

Schindler went bankrupt keeping his factory running, having spent his remaining money on food and supplies, bribes to the SS, and purchases of artillery shells from other factories that he passed off as having been made at Brünnlitz. The factory produced no usable armaments of its own, a strategy deliberately chosen by Schindler in the hope of hastening the war's end by contributing nothing to German military efforts. The Red Army liberated Brünnlitz on May 9, 1945. A few days prior, the SS guards had deserted and Schindler had escaped to American lines with the help of his Jewish workers, carrying a letter written by them that attested to his rescue activities.

As of October 2016,  and the Endowment Fund for the Memorial of the Shoah and Oskar Schindler has purchased the site where the camp was located and plans to convert it into a museum.

Timeline

1840s: The Löw-Beer Jewish family moved into the area. They set up the factory, making high-quality textiles.
1938: The Germans occupied Czechoslovakia. The Löw-Beer family fled to Britain. Germans took over the factory.
1944: Oskar Schindler brought his Jews to Brněnec and started to work the factory.
May 1945: Russians liberated Brněnec. Afterwards, the Communist government of Czechoslovakia nationalized the factory.
1989: Fall of Communism. The factory went into private hands. In its last years the factory made car seat covers and airline blankets. Its last general manager was František Olbert.
2010: The factory closed and was left abandoned. Afterwards, thieves stripped out much of its wood and metal.
2017: The local government of Brno invited the Low-Beers to come back to the area. František Olbert approached Daniel Löw-Beer.
Daniel Löw-Beer works for the World Health Organization in Geneva and runs the Ark Foundation, which owns the factory. There is a plan to turn the derelict factory into a museum called Schindler's Ark.

References

External links
Oskar Schindler's Factory in Brünnlitz, Czechia, as it stands today

Gross-Rosen concentration camp
Internment camps
Oskar Schindler